Lloyd Ashton "Tom" Fallers, Jr. (August 29, 1925 – July 4, 1974) was the A. A. Michelson Distinguished Service Professor in the departments of anthropology and sociology at the University of Chicago. Fallers' work in social and cultural anthropology focused on social stratification and the development of new states in East Africa (especially Buganda) and Turkey.

References

Social anthropologists
Cultural anthropologists
American sociologists
University of Chicago alumni
University of Chicago faculty
1925 births
1974 deaths
People from Nebraska City, Nebraska
20th-century American anthropologists